Jorge Luis García Pérez (known as Antúnez, born 10 October 1964, Placetas, Cuba) is an Afro-Cuban human rights and democracy activist.

Dissident career
Antúnez was jailed for 17 years from 1990 to 2007. Other dissidents have referred to Antúnez as Cuba's Nelson Mandela.

During a demonstration in March 1990 State Security heard him saying that communism is an error and a dystopia. Saying that was a crime of "verbal enemy propaganda" and he was sentenced to five years in prison. In prison, he refused to wear the uniform and participate in "re-education", which meant violent beatings, nine months in solitary confinement and more years in prison. He escaped from prison to see his sick mother, but could not find her and was free only for a day. His mother died a month later. He was found guilty of "attempted sabotage". One of the charges was failure to respect the Cuban leader Fidel Castro.

Antúnez continued nonviolent resistance in prison, where he gave birth to a political prisoner group named after Pedro Luis Boitel, an imprisoned dissident who died in a hunger strike in 1972. His courage received worldwide attention. Pope John Paul II, when visiting Cuba in 1998, asked the regime to release him.

Antúnez was released in 2007, ahead of talks on European Union sanctions, after being imprisoned for 17 years and 34 days.

Antúnez, his ex-wife Iris, and Diosiris Santana Pérez launched a hunger strike in 2009. Several leaders from Uruguay, Costa Rica, and Argentina declared their support for Antúnez. Police threatened Antúnez with eviction from his house and "disobedience" charges for hosting three other dissident thinkers (Osiris Santana Pérez, Ernesto Mederos Arrozarena and Carlos Michael Morales Rodríguez) in his home in April 2009.

Antúnez's ex-wife founded the Rosa Parks Feminist Movement for Civil Rights. Antunez himself was a member  of Orlando Zapata Tamayo which was to defend political prisoners. 

When President Barack Obama announced a blueprint for normalizing relations with Cuba on December 17, 2014, Antunez assailed the normalization plan as a capitulation to the Cuban government, echoing the views of Berta Soler and Oscar Elias Biscet that the US should have demanded democratic reforms in Cuba before contemplating a change in US policy towards Cuba.

Antúnez moved to the United States with his wife, Magalys Rivaflecha, and daughter in 2019.

See also
 Cuban democracy movement
 Human rights in Cuba
 Censorship in Cuba
 Cuban dissident movement

References

External links
 Payolibre.com profile 	
 Jorge Luis García Pérez  Freedom Collection interview

1964 births
Living people
Cuban activists
Cuban anti-communists
Cuban democracy activists
Cuban dissidents
Cuban human rights activists
Cuban prisoners and detainees
Hunger strikers
Opposition to Fidel Castro
People from Placetas
Cuban people of African descent